Bettye Jean Davis (née Ivory; May 17, 1938 – December 2, 2018) was an American social worker and politician. She was the first African-American to be elected as an Alaska State Senator in 2000.

Davis was a Democratic Party member of the Alaska House of Representatives, representing the fourteenth and twenty-first districts from 1991 through 1996 and the Alaska Senate, representing the K District from 2000 through 2013. During her time in the Alaska Senate she co-sponsored legislation introduced by Representative Sharon M. Cissna to address the needs of Alaska's aging adult population. Senator Davis was referred to as "the conscience of the Legislature" due to her advocacy for programs which supported vulnerable Alaskans.

She was inducted into the Alaska Women's Hall of Fame in 2010. She was defeated in the 2012 general election for State Senate district M by Anna Fairclough. In April 2013 she was elected to the Anchorage School Board, a body on which she'd served non-consecutive terms in the 1980s and 1990s. Davis died at her home in Anchorage at the age of 80.

In July 2020, Bettye Davis East Anchorage High School, a high school in Anchorage was renamed in her honor.

Biography

Early life
Davis was born to Daniel and Rosyland Ivory on May 17, 1938, in Homer, Louisiana and graduated from Elliott High School in Bernice, La.

Education 
Davis graduated from Elliott High School in Bernice, Louisiana in 1956. She received her bachelor's degree in social work from Grambling State University in 1972, her nursing degree from Saint Anthony College of Nursing in 1961 and completed graduate level studies in social work at the University of Alaska Anchorage.

Expanded description
She resided in Anchorage, Alaska for over 45 years where she was an active member of the Shiloh Missionary Baptist Church. Davis served on the NAACP Anchorage branch board of directors for four years (1978-1982).

Significant legislation 
As a result of the 2004 bipartisan Legislative hearing, "Aging Adults: Is there room for us in Alaska," which captured testimony from hundreds of aging Alaskans, their families and caregivers, Davis helped develop the SeniorCare program. SeniorCare (2004) sought to fill a need for prescription drug relief following the cut of the Alaska Longevity Bonus program in 2003 and prior to the implementation of the Federal Medicare prescription drug program in 2006.  Additionally, 39 recommendations were put forth as a result of the panel discussions and testimony collected during the legislative hearing. Recommendations addressed critical needs and improvements to senior services in areas of organizational effectiveness, program development, program integrity, research and education and funding.

Honors, decorations, awards and distinctions

 Appointed by Alaska Governor Tony Knowles to the State Board of Education (1998).  
 Pioneer Woman of the Year Award, 2010.
Recipient of the Celebrate Liberty Award from the Alaska Civil Liberties Union, 2010.
Inducted into the Alaska Women's Hall of Fame in 2010.
 A profile of Davis was featured as part of the Anchorage Museum's, Extra Tough: Women of the North Exhibit, 2020.
In July 2020, Bettye Davis East Anchorage High School, a high school in Anchorage was renamed in her honor.

Notes

External links
 Alaska State Legislature – Senator Bettye Davisofficial government website
 Project Vote Smart – Senator Bettye Davis (AK) profile
 Follow the Money – Bettye Davis
 2006 2004 2000 1996 1994 1992 1990 campaign contributions
 Bettye Davis at 100 Years of Alaska's Legislature
"Guide to the Bettye Davis papers 1976-2012". Archives and Special Collections of the University of Alaska/Alaska Pacific University Consortium Library

1938 births
2018 deaths
20th-century American politicians
20th-century American women politicians
21st-century American politicians
21st-century American women politicians
African-American nurses
American nurses
American women nurses
African-American state legislators in Alaska
African-American women in politics
Democratic Party Alaska state senators
American social workers
Grambling State University alumni
Democratic Party members of the Alaska House of Representatives
People from Homer, Louisiana
School board members in Alaska
University of Alaska Anchorage alumni
Women state legislators in Alaska
20th-century African-American women
20th-century African-American politicians
21st-century African-American women
21st-century African-American politicians